Mohanpura Ranwa is a village in Mandi patwar circle in Phagi tehsil in Jaipur district, Rajasthan.

In Mohanpura Ranwa, there are 89 households with total population of 636 (with 54.56% males and 45.44% females), based on 2011 census. Total area of village is 6.91 km2.  There is one primary school in Mohanpura Ranwa village.

References

Villages in Jaipur district